RISD blue is a vivid blue color named after Rhode Island School of Design. RISD Blue has been identified as RISD's official color as of September 28, 2022 and is the current official color listed by the Rhode Island School of Design's visual identity. The color is selected because of it is "vibrant and electric hue—rich and saturated" and "it activates any canvas it appears on."

See also
 List of colors

References 

Shades of azure
Shades of blue
School colors